Maggie Chiang Mei-chi is a Taiwanese singer and songwriter. She is dubbed a "therapeutic singer" (療傷系歌手) by the Chinese-language media for her heartfelt delivery of ballads.

Discography

Studio albums
 1999: I Love Faye Wong (我愛王菲)
 1999: Love at Second Sight (第二眼美女)
 2000: Whispering Words (悄悄話)
 2001: Remembrance (想起)
 2002: Once Again (再一次也好)
 2003: Melody (美樂地)
 2003: Friend of a Friend (朋友的朋友)
 2005: Lover's Poem (戀人心中有一首詩)
 2006: Crybaby (愛哭鬼)
 2012: My Room (房間)
 2017: Dear World (親愛的世界)
 2018: As Long,As Life (我們都是有歌的人)

Compilation albums
 2004: Beautiful But Lonely (又寂寞又美麗)

Extended plays
 2010: The Weight of Love (愛情的重量)

Singles
 2010: "Under The Moonlight" (月光下)
 2010: "You Do Love Me" (你是愛我的)
 2018: "Spinner" (陀螺)
 2018: "Treasure" (家珍)

Filmography
 Where's the Dragon? (2015)

Awards and nominations

References

External links

  江美琪 Maggie

Taiwanese Mandopop singer-songwriters
1980 births
Living people
Taiwanese people of Hakka descent
Hakka musicians
Taiwanese television actresses
Taiwanese stage actresses
21st-century Taiwanese singers
21st-century Taiwanese actresses
21st-century Taiwanese women singers